Biancalana is a surname. Notable people with the surname include:

 Buddy Biancalana (born 1960), American baseball player
 Mario Biancalana (1902–after 1948), Brazilian fencer

See also
 Biancalani